JUV may refer to:
 Juvenile (disambiguation)
 Juventus F.C.
 Upernavik Airport, in Greenland